Dan Inosanto (born 1936) is an American martial arts instructor. Inosanto is an authority on Jeet Kune Do, Filipino Martial Arts, and Pencak Silat.

Inosanto is credited for training martial arts to a number of Hollywood actors including Bruce Lee, Chuck Norris and others.

Early life and education
Dan Inosanto began training in martial arts at the age of 11 receiving instruction from his uncle who first taught him traditional Okinawan Karate and later also Judo and Jujutsu. He was a student of Ed Parker, from whom he received a shodan rank in American Kenpo. Dan served as a paratrooper with the 101st Airborne Division from 1959 to 1961. He was also a member of the Strategic Army Corps. At Fort Campbell he refined his skills in various martial arts, training under Henry Slomanski.

Inosanto is one of three people who have been appointed to teach at one of the three Jun Fan Gung Fu Institutes under Bruce Lee; Taky Kimura and James Yimm Lee are the other two people. Inosanto studied with different martial arts masters elsewhere in the United States, Southeast Asia, and Europe, including Johnny Lacoste and Chai Sirisute. After Bruce Lee's death, Inosanto  became the principal spokesperson and historian for Jeet Kune Do. He has had minor roles in a number of films, including Bruce Lee's uncompleted last film Game of Death (1972). During this time period (1964–75), he also taught physical education at Malaga Cove Intermediate School in Palos Verdes Estates, California. Dan was commissioned in 1977 by the Dallas Cowboys to incorporate martial arts into the team’s training.

The film I Am Bruce Lee provided Inosanto an opportunity to reveal a little-known fact about the friendship the two men shared. Inosanto was teacher to Bruce Lee, introducing him to nunchaku. Inosanto explained that he introduced the weapon to Lee, taught him the basics and some exercises to get him started on his weapons training. The Game of Death movie, one of the most recognizable of the Bruce Lee films, showcases the use of the nunchaku by Lee and Inosanto. He is featured as the Black Belt magazine's 1996 "Man of the Year".

Inosanto holds Instructor or black belt level ranks in several martial arts. He is known for promoting the Filipino Martial Arts. He is responsible for bringing several obscure forms of the South East Asia Martial Arts into the public eye such as Silat, a hybrid combative form existing in such countries as Indonesia, Malaysia, and the Philippines. He has recently acquired his black belt in the Machado family style of Brazilian Jiu Jitsu. He trained Shoot wrestling under Yorinaga Nakamura. Currently he is the vice-president of Lameco International, carrying on the Eskrima of the late Filipino martial artist Edgar Sulite. Inosanto has appeared on YouTube videos talking about training in Systema and appreciation for his teacher, Martin Wheeler.

Notable students
Inosanto teaches The Art and Philosophy of Jeet Kune Do, Filipino Martial Arts, Shoot wrestling, Brazilian Jiu Jitsu, Eskrima, Muay Thai, Silat, mixed martial arts and other arts at his Marina del Rey, California school, the Inosanto Academy of Martial Arts.

Dan Inosanto's famous students include:

 Diana Lee Inosanto
 Bruce Lee: Inosanto taught him Nunchaku and staff.
 Brandon Lee
 Ron Balicki
 Denzel Washington
 Edgar Sulite
 Jeff Imada
 Erik Paulson
 Graciela Casillas-Tortorelli
 Ernest Emerson
 Ricky Nelson
 Jerry Poteet
 Salem Assli

Publications
 Filipino Martial Arts as Taught by Dan Inosanto by Dan Inosanto 
 Absorb What Is Useful (Jeet Kune Do Guidebook Vol 2) by Dan Inosanto 
 Jeet kune do by Salem Assli and Dan Inosanto 
 Guide to Martial Arts Training With Equipment by Dan Inosanto 
 Jeet Kune Do: The Art & Philosophy of Bruce Lee by Dan Inosanto 
 Jeet Kune Do: Conditioning and Grappling Methods Intro by Dan Inosanto

Filmography

Actor
 2008 Redbelt as Master Joāo "The Professor" Moro
 2007 Big Stan as Knife fighting Cook
 2003 Brazilian Brawl as Ruben
 1991 Out for Justice as "Sticks"
 1986 Big Trouble in Little China (as Daniel Inosanto)
 1981 Sharky's Machine as Chin #1
 1981 Long de ying zi (as Danny Inosanto)
 1981 Skirmish
 1981 The Chinese Stuntman as Filipino Fighter
 1978 Game of Death as Pasquale, Filipino Fighter
 1975 The Killer Elite as Japanese Killer
 1972 The Game of Death as 3rd Floor Guardian
 1966 The Green Hornet (episode title: "Praying Mantis") (Stuntman for Mako)

Documentaries
 2012 I Am Bruce Lee
 2008 The Legend of Bruce Lee
 2006 Fight Science
 2002 Modern Warriors
 2002 Bruce Lee: The Immortal Dragon
 2000 Bruce Lee in G.O.D.: Shibôteki yûgi
 2000 Bruce Lee: A Warrior's Journey
 1999 Famous Families (The Lees: Action Speaks Louder)
 1998 The Path of the Dragon
 1997 E! True Hollywood Story (Brandon Lee)
 1993 Bruce Lee: The Curse of the Dragon
 1993 Dragon: The Bruce Lee Story
 1977 Bruce Lee, the Legend
 1976 The Warrior Within
 1976 Bruce Lee's Secret
 1973 Life and Legend of Bruce Lee

Stunts
 1996 Escape from L.A. (stunts)
 1966 The Green Hornet (1 episode) (fight double)

References

Bibliography

Further reading

External links
Inosanto Academy

Success Principles of Dan Inosanto

Living people
American practitioners of Brazilian jiu-jitsu
American eskrimadors
1936 births
American Jeet Kune Do practitioners
American male karateka
American Muay Thai practitioners
Muay Thai trainers
American martial artists of Filipino descent
American male actors
Filipino eskrimadors
Filipino male karateka
American Kenpo practitioners